Yun Mi-gyeong (born 18 October 1968) is a South Korean sprinter. She competed in the women's 4 × 100 metres relay at the 1988 Summer Olympics.

Yun attended Incheon Girls' Middle School, and represented her school at the National Youth Sports Festival in 1982, placing second in the girls' 100 metres. She went on to attend Inil Girls' High School, also in Incheon. Her team's time of 45.59 in the women's 4 × 100 metres relay at the 1986 Asian Games remained the South Korean record for 23 years until it was broken at the 2009 Korean National Sports Festival (KNSF) by the North Gyeongsang Province team. She gained admission to Inha University, also in Incheon, and represented the school at the KNSF in 1989 and 1990. She returned to the Asian Games in 1990, but in the 200 metres event she was eliminated in the preliminary round. Her time of 24.51 in the women's 200 metres at the 1991 KNSF stood as the festival record until broken by Lee Yeon-kyung at the 2006 KNSF. She later represented Incheon City Hall at the National Assorted Track and Field Championships (전국종별육상경기선수권대회), coming in first place in the 200 metres in 1991 and the 100 metres in 1992.

References

External links
 

1968 births
Living people
Athletes (track and field) at the 1986 Asian Games
Athletes (track and field) at the 1988 Summer Olympics
Athletes (track and field) at the 1990 Asian Games
Inha University alumni
South Korean female sprinters
Olympic athletes of South Korea
Place of birth missing (living people)
Asian Games medalists in athletics (track and field)
Asian Games bronze medalists for South Korea
Medalists at the 1986 Asian Games
Olympic female sprinters